The individual endurance competition at the 2006 FEI World Equestrian Games was held on August 21, 2006.

Medalists

Complete results

Finishers

Did not finish

External links
Official list of competitors
Official results
Finishers
Did not finish

Endurance